Britne Oldford (born July 23, 1992) is a Canadian actress. She is best known for portraying Cadie Campbell on Skins, Alma Walker on American Horror Story: Asylum, Remy Beaumont on Ravenswood, Regan on Hunters, and as Fei Hargreeves / Sparrow Number Three in The Umbrella Academy (2022).

Life and career

Britne grew up in Toronto, Ontario, and attended Earl Haig Secondary School as a part of the Claude Watson Arts programs as a drama major. In 2008, she starred as Lady Macbeth in a production of Macbeth that advanced to the final showcase of the Sears Drama Festival.

Filmography

References

External links
 

1992 births
Living people
21st-century Canadian actresses
Actresses from Toronto
Canadian film actresses
Canadian television actresses